Zbigniew Stryj (born 2 January 1968 in Zabrze, Poland) is a Polish actor.

Filmography
Goracy czwartek (1994)
Święta polskie
Barbórka (2005) as Hubert Szewczyk
Na Wspólnej (2005 – current) as Adam Roztocki
Kryminalni (2006) as Erwin Zych
Co slonko widzialo (2006) as Guardian
Benek (2007) as Eryk Kacik
Drzazgi (2008) as Brother of Bartek's wife
Karbala (2015)

References

External links

Polish male film actors
1968 births
Living people
Polish male stage actors
Polish male television actors
People from Zabrze
Polish film actors